Imani Sanga is Professor of Music in the Department of Creative Arts, formerly called Department of Fine and Performing Arts, in the College of Humanities at the University of Dar es Salaam, Tanzania. He teaches courses in Ethnomusicology, Philosophy of Music, Composition and Choral Music. And he conducts the university choir.

Life
Born in 1972, Imani Sanga was educated at Chimala Primary School, Kidugala Lutheran Seminary, University of Dar es Salaam and the University of KwaZulu-Natal. He earned his BA in 1999 and MA in 2001, both from the University of Dar es Salaam. He earned his PhD degree from the University of KwaZulu-Natal in 2006. He wrote his PhD dissertation entitled Muziki wa Injili: Temporal and Spatial Aesthetics of Popular Church Music in Dar es Salaam, Tanzania (1980s–2005) under the supervision of Professor Beverly Parker. He spent August to December 2007 as a research scholar at the University of Massachusetts Amherst and Mount Holyoke College, through the Five College African Scholars Program, working on the manuscript for a book based on his PhD dissertation. In 2009, he won a fellowship from the African Humanities Program (AHP) of the American Council of Learned Societies (ACLS) to work on his book on post-colonial soundscapes. He is also a recipient of Kent R. Mulikin fellowship at the National Humanities Center (2019-2020).

Works
Sanga's research and published works focus on the church music and popular music of Tanzania, in relation to the construction of gendered, religious and national identities within the context of globalisation as well as the use of music in Tanzanian Swahili literature. His work draws from a number of theoretical perspectives from African philosophy, aesthetics of music, post colonial theory, cultural theory and continental philosophy.

Books
2010
Sounds of Muziki wa Injili: Temporal and Spatial Aesthetics of Contemporary Church Music in Dar es Salaam, Tanzania. (Lambert Academic Publishing)

This book focuses on Muziki wa Injili (gospel music), one of the newer music genres in Tanzania. It explores the ways in which performances of this music and practices surrounding its creation and use are related to various concepts of time and space. Through ethnographic accounts and musical analyses, he examines various changes that have taken place in Muziki wa Injili since the 1980s to 2005 and he discusses the role this music genre has played in shaping people’s experiences of events, identities and social relations (with particular reference to gendered, national and religious identities and relations) in Dar es Salaam.

1996
Nyimbo za Tanzania. Published by the Finnish-Tanzanian Friendship Society, Helsinki

This book is a songbook collection of Sanga's earlier compositions and arrangements of traditional songs from various music cultures in Tanzania for church choirs.

Articles
2020
"Musical Figures of Enslavement and Resistance in Semzaba’s Kiswahili Play Tendehogo". African Studies 79(3): 323-338.

"Musical Figuring of Dar es Salaam Urban Marginality in Mbogo‘s Swahili Novel Watoto wa Maman’tilie". Journal of Literary Studies 36(2): 67-84

2019
"Sonic Figures of Heroism and the 1891 Hehe-German War in Mulokozi’s Novel Ngome ya Mianzi". Journal of Postcolonial Writing 55(5): 698-709.

2018
"The Antinomies of Transgressive Gender Acts in Professor Jay’s Rap Music Video “Zali la Mentali” in Tanzania". Journal of Literary Studies 34(1): 104—117.

"Musical Figures and the Figuring of Tanzania’s Social Life in the Poems of Kulikoyela K. Kahigi". Journal of Postcolonial Writing 54(2): 214—225

2017
"Antinomies of African Aesthetics and the Impulses of Aesthetic Relativism: Reading Agawu, P‘Bitek and Abiodun". African Identities 15 (3): 310—323.

2016
"The Archiving of Siti Binti Saad and Her Engagement with the Music Industry in Shaaban Robert‘s Wasifu wa Siti Binti Saad". Eastern African Literary and Cultural Studies 2 (1-2): 34-44.

2015
"Marimba and the Musical Figuring of Desire and Postcolonial National Identity in Edwin Semzaba's Novel "Marimba ya Majaliwa"". IRASM: International Review of the Aesthetics and Sociology of Music 46 (2): 401-421.

2014
"Postcolonial archival fever and the musical archiving of African identity in selected paintings by Elias Jengo". Journal of African Cultural Studies 26, No. 2, 140–154

2013
"The Limits and Ambivalences of Postcolonial Consciousness in Mbunga's Church Law and Bantu Music". Yearbook for Traditional Music 45: 125–141.
"The Figuring of Postcolonial Urban Segmentarity and Marginality in Selected "Bongo Fleva" Songs in Dar es Salaam, Tanzania". IRASM: International Review of the Aesthetics and Sociology of Music 44 (2): 385–405.

2011
"Music and the Regulatory Regimes of Gender and Sexuality in Tanzania". Popular Music and Society 34 (3): 351–368
"Mzungu Kichaa and the Figuring of Identity in Bongo Fleva Music in Tanzania". International Review of the Aesthetics and Sociology of Music 42 (1): 189–208.

2010
"Dr. Remmy Ongala and the Traveling sounds: Postcolonial cosmopolitan music in Dar es Salaam, Tanzania." African Studies Review 53 (3): 61–76.
"The practice and politics of hybrid soundscapes in Muziki wa Injili in Dar es Salaam, Tanzania". Journal of African Cultural Studies 22 (2): 145–156

2009
"Teaching-Learning Processes in Muziki wa Injili in Dar es Salaam". African Music: Journal of the International Library of African Music 8 (3): 132—143.

2008
"Music and nationalism in Tanzania: Dynamics of national space in Muziki wa Injili in Dar es Salaam". Ethnomusicology 52 (1): 52—84.

2007
"Gender in church music: Dynamics of gendered space in Muziki wa Injili in Dar es Salaam, Tanzania". Journal of Popular Music Studies 19 (1): 59—91

2006
"Composition processes in popular church music in Dar es Salaam, Tanzania". Ethnomusicology Forum 15 (2): 247—271.
"Kumpolo: Aesthetic appreciation and cultural appropriation of bird sounds in Tanzania". Folklore 117 (1): 97—102

Music albums
 Ninakuja Bwana (1999)
 Anabisha Fungua (2002, with The Patmos)
 Haleluya Yesu Yu Hai (2004, with The Patmos)

Groups performed with
 University Choir at the University of Dar es Salaam, as conductor.
 The Patmos (a university-based gospel music group), as guitarist and keyboardist
 Kwaya ya Uinjilisti Sayuni (Sayuni Evangelical Choir), as guitarist, keyboardist and singer
 Kwaya ya Uinjilisti Kijitonyama (Kijitonyama Evangelical Choir), as guitarist, keyboardist and singer
 Kwaya Kuu (Main Choir) of CCT at the University of Dar es Salaam, as conductor/mwalimu and organist
 Kwaya ya Watoto (Children's Choir) of CCT at the University of Dar es Salaam, as conductor/mwalimu and organist
 Kidugala Lutheran Seminary Choir in Njombe, Iringa, as conductor
 In 2004–2005 he sang with the Durban Chamber Choir in South Africa as a tenor singer while studying at KwaZulu-Natal University.
 In 2007 (August–December) he sang with the Hampshire Choral Society in Massachusetts, USA.

References

1972 births
Tanzanian musicians
Ethnomusicologists
Male composers
Living people
University of KwaZulu-Natal alumni